Victor Max Colani (30 October 1895 – 25 November 1957) was a German actor.

He was born in Zittau and died in The Hague, Netherlands.

Selected filmography
 Der vergiftete Strom (1921)
 Lightning Command (1921)
 The Poisoned Stream (1921)
 Fratricide (1922)
 The Man in the Background (1922)
 Old Heidelberg (1923)
 Lightning (1925)
 Reveille: The Great Awakening (1925)
 Princess Trulala (1926)
 Ehekonflikte (1927)
 Give Me Life (1928)
 Single Mother (1928)
 They May Not Marry (1929)
 Attorney for the Heart (1927)
 Revenge for Eddy (1929)

Bibliography
 Weinberg, Herman G. The Lubitsch Louch: A Critical Study. Dover Publications, 1977.

External links

1895 births
1957 deaths
German male film actors
German male silent film actors
People from Zittau
20th-century German male actors